Nuggety Gully Water Race and Chinese Camp is a heritage-listed mining camp at Mareeba Mining District, Lakeland, Shire of Cook, Queensland, Australia. It is also known as Greasy Bill Creek water race, Prospect Creek Stone Walls, and Star of Normanby Mine. It was added to the Queensland Heritage Register on 21 October 1992.

History 
Gold was first discovered "officially" in the West Normanby River area, southwest of Cooktown, in November 1874. The first official figures estimate that by the end of January 1875, over 600 men were on the field, many from Maytown. At this point no Chinese appear to have been allowed (by Mining Warden Philip Frederic Sellheim) to enter the diggings. However, by February 1878, at least 200 Chinese were reported to be working the alluvials.

In May 1886 Mining Warden Howard Saint George visited the diggings and reported 34 Europeans working the reefs and thirty to forty Chinese employed exclusively in alluvial workings and in gardening. There were three gardens principally devoted to maize, for which there was a ready sale at the reefs.

In 1898 R. L. Jack, the Government Geologist, took a hurried look at the reefs long after most of the diggings had been abandoned. His map shows Chinese camps in the district but not at Nuggety Gully, between "Prospector's Gully" and the Star of Normanby reef. Therefore it is likely that the retaining walls and terraced camp site were constructed between 1878 (the heyday of early mining) and 1886.

Description 
On some bends they are constructed on both sides of the creek, and in two or more tiers.

A Chinese settlement site is located on Prospect Creek at its junction with Nuggety Gully. The site comprises nine small earth terraces, several containing stone edging and two containing fireplaces. The larger stone fireplace or oven has recently been partially reconstructed and sticks have been placed across the top. This structure has been wrongly described in a nomination to the Australian Heritage Commission for entry on the Register of the National Estate as "a fort in which Chinese miners hid from attacking Aborigines and fired on them".

Heritage listing 
Nuggety Gully Water Race and Chinese Camp was listed on the Queensland Heritage Register on 21 October 1992 having satisfied the following criteria.

The place is important in demonstrating the evolution or pattern of Queensland's history.

The Nuggety Gully stone-pitched retaining walls and Chinese camp are significant in Queensland's history as the finest and most extensive surviving example of Chinese stonework.

The place demonstrates rare, uncommon or endangered aspects of Queensland's cultural heritage.

The direct associations of stone retaining walls, Chinese camp sites and conventional mine workings is exceptional.

The place has potential to yield information that will contribute to an understanding of Queensland's history.

Further archaeological and archival investigation could yield information on the extent of Chinese activities and involvement in the Star of Normanby mine area.

The place is important in demonstrating the principal characteristics of a particular class of cultural places.

The quality of the stonework is significant and it has remained intact due to the broken nature of the country and the difficulties in achieving vehicle access, discouraging subsequent attempts at remining.

References

Attribution

External links 

Queensland Heritage Register
Lakeland, Queensland
Mines in Queensland
Articles incorporating text from the Queensland Heritage Register
Buildings and structures in Far North Queensland